

Events

Pre-1600
 451 – Attila the Hun captures Metz in France, killing most of its inhabitants and burning the town.
 529 – First Corpus Juris Civilis, a fundamental work in jurisprudence, is issued by Eastern Roman Emperor Justinian I.
1141 – Empress Matilda becomes the first female ruler of England, adopting the title "Lady of the English".
1348 – Holy Roman Emperor Charles IV charters Prague University.
1449 – Felix V abdicates his claim to the papacy, ending the reign of the final Antipope.
1521 – Ferdinand Magellan arrives at Cebu.
1541 – Francis Xavier leaves Lisbon on a mission to the Portuguese East Indies.

1601–1900
1724 – Premiere performance of Johann Sebastian Bach's St John Passion, BWV 245, at St. Nicholas Church, Leipzig.
1767 – End of Burmese–Siamese War (1765–67).
1788 – Settlers establish Marietta, Ohio, the first permanent settlement created by U.S. citizens in the recently organized Northwest Territory.
1795 – The French First Republic adopts the kilogram and gram as its primary unit of mass.
1790 – Greek War of Independence: Greek revolutionary Lambros Katsonis loses three of his ships in the Battle of Andros. 
1798 – The Mississippi Territory is organized from disputed territory claimed by both the United States and the Spanish Empire.  It is expanded in 1804 and again in 1812.
1805 – Lewis and Clark Expedition: The Corps of Discovery breaks camp among the Mandan tribe and resumes its journey West along the Missouri River.
1805 – German composer Ludwig van Beethoven premieres his Third Symphony, at the Theater an der Wien in Vienna.
1831 – Pedro II becomes Emperor of Brazil. 
1862 – American Civil War: The Union's Army of the Tennessee and the Army of the Ohio defeat the Confederate Army of Mississippi near Shiloh, Tennessee.
1868 – Thomas D'Arcy McGee, one of the Canadian Fathers of Confederation, is assassinated by a Fenian activist.

1901–present
1906 – Mount Vesuvius erupts and devastates Naples.
  1906   – The Algeciras Conference gives France and Spain control over Morocco.
1922 – Teapot Dome scandal: United States Secretary of the Interior Albert B. Fall leases federal petroleum reserves to private oil companies on excessively generous terms.
1926 – Violet Gibson attempts to assassinate Italian Prime Minister Benito Mussolini. 
1927 – AT&T transmits the first long-distance public television broadcast (from Washington, D.C., to New York City, displaying the image of Commerce Secretary Herbert Hoover).
1933 – Prohibition in the United States is repealed for beer of no more than 3.2% alcohol by weight, eight months before the ratification of the Twenty-first Amendment to the United States Constitution. (Now celebrated as National Beer Day in the United States.)
  1933   – Nazi Germany issues the Law for the Restoration of the Professional Civil Service banning Jews and political dissidents from civil service posts. 
1939 – Benito Mussolini declares an Italian protectorate over Albania and forces King Zog I into exile. 
1940 – Booker T. Washington becomes the first African American to be depicted on a United States postage stamp.
1943 – The Holocaust in Ukraine: In Terebovlia, Germans order 1,100 Jews to undress and march through the city to the nearby village of Plebanivka, where they are shot and buried in ditches.
  1943   – Ioannis Rallis becomes collaborationist Prime Minister of Greece during the Axis Occupation.
  1943   – The National Football League makes helmets mandatory. 
1945 – World War II: The Imperial Japanese Navy battleship Yamato, one of the two largest ever constructed, is sunk by United States Navy aircraft during Operation Ten-Go.
1946 – The Soviet Union annexes East Prussia as the Kaliningrad Oblast of the Russian Soviet Federative Socialist Republic.
1948 – The World Health Organization is established by the United Nations.
1954 – United States President Dwight D. Eisenhower gives his "domino theory" speech during a news conference.
1955 – Winston Churchill resigns as Prime Minister of the United Kingdom amid indications of failing health.
1956 – Francoist Spain agrees to surrender its protectorate in Morocco.
1964 – IBM announces the System/360.
1965 – Representatives of the National Congress of American Indians testify before members of the US Senate in Washington, D.C. against the termination of the Colville tribe.
1968 – Two-time Formula One British World Champion Jim Clark dies in an accident during a Formula Two race in Hockenheim.
1969 – The Internet's symbolic birth date: Publication of RFC 1.
1971 – Vietnam War: President Richard Nixon announces his decision to quicken the pace of Vietnamization.
1972 – Vietnam War: Communist forces overrun the South Vietnamese town of Loc Ninh. 
1976 – Member of Parliament and suspected spy John Stonehouse resigns from the Labour Party after being arrested for faking his own death.
1977 – German Federal prosecutor Siegfried Buback and his driver are shot by two Red Army Faction members while waiting at a red light.
1978 – Development of the neutron bomb is canceled by President Jimmy Carter.
1980 – During the Iran hostage crisis, the United States severs relations with Iran. 
1982 – Iranian Foreign Affairs Minister Sadegh Ghotbzadeh is arrested. 
1983 – During STS-6, astronauts Story Musgrave and Don Peterson perform the first Space Shuttle spacewalk.
1988 – Soviet Defense Minister Dmitry Yazov orders the Soviet withdrawal from Afghanistan.
1989 – Soviet submarine Komsomolets sinks in the Barents Sea off the coast of Norway, killing 42 sailors.
1990 – A fire breaks out on the passenger ferry Scandinavian Star, killing 159 people.
  1990   – John Poindexter is convicted for his role in the Iran–Contra affair.  In 1991 the convictions are reversed on appeal.
1994 – Rwandan genocide: Massacres of Tutsis begin in Kigali, Rwanda, and soldiers kill the civilian Prime Minister Agathe Uwilingiyimana. 
  1994   – Auburn Calloway attempts to destroy Federal Express Flight 705 in order to allow his family to benefit from his life insurance policy.
1995 – First Chechen War: Russian paramilitary troops begin a massacre of civilians in Samashki, Chechnya.
1999 – Turkish Airlines Flight 5904 crashes near Ceyhan in southern Turkey, killing six people.
2001 – NASA launches the 2001 Mars Odyssey orbiter. 
2003 – Iraq War: U.S. troops capture Baghdad; Saddam Hussein's Ba'athist regime falls two days later.
2009 – Former Peruvian President Alberto Fujimori is sentenced to 25 years in prison for ordering killings and kidnappings by security forces.
  2009   – Mass protests begin across Moldova under the belief that results from the parliamentary election are fraudulent.
2011 – The Israel Defense Forces use their Iron Dome missile system to successfully intercept a BM-21 Grad launched from Gaza, marking the first short-range missile intercept ever.
2017 – A man deliberately drives a hijacked truck into a crowd of people in Stockholm, Sweden, killing five people and injuring fifteen others.
  2017   – U.S. President Donald Trump orders the 2017 Shayrat missile strike against Syria in retaliation for the Khan Shaykhun chemical attack. 
2018 – Former Brazilian president, Luiz Inácio Lula da Silva, is arrested for corruption by determination of Judge Sérgio Moro, from the “Car-Wash Operation”. Lula stayed imprisoned for 580 days, after being released by the Brazilian Supreme Court.
  2018   – Syria launches the Douma chemical attack during the Eastern Ghouta offensive of the Syrian Civil War.
2020 – COVID-19 pandemic: China ends its lockdown in Wuhan. 
  2020   – COVID-19 pandemic: Acting Secretary of the Navy Thomas Modly resigns for his handling of the COVID-19 pandemic on USS Theodore Roosevelt and the dismissal of Brett Crozier. 
2021 – COVID-19 pandemic: The Centers for Disease Control and Prevention announces that the SARS-CoV-2 Alpha variant has become the dominant strain of COVID-19 in the United States.
2022 – Ketanji Brown Jackson is confirmed for the Supreme Court of the United States, becoming the first black female justice.

Births

Pre-1600
1206 – Otto II Wittelsbach, Duke of Bavaria (d. 1253)
1330 – John, 3rd Earl of Kent, English nobleman (d. 1352)
1470 – Edward Stafford, 2nd Earl of Wiltshire (d. 1498)
1506 – Francis Xavier, Spanish missionary and saint, co-founded the Society of Jesus (d. 1552)
1539 – Tobias Stimmer, Swiss painter and illustrator (d. 1584)

1601–1900
1613 – Gerrit Dou, Dutch painter (d. 1675)
1644 – François de Neufville, duc de Villeroy, French general (d. 1730)
1648 – John Sheffield, 1st Duke of Buckingham and Normanby, English poet and politician, Lord President of the Council (d. 1721)
1652 – Pope Clement XII (d. 1740)
1713 – Nicola Sala, Italian composer and theorist (d. 1801)
1718 – Hugh Blair, Scottish minister and author (d. 1800)
1727 – Michel Adanson, French botanist, entomologist, and mycologist (d. 1806)
1763 – Domenico Dragonetti, Italian bassist and composer (d. 1846)
1770 – William Wordsworth, English poet (d. 1850)
1772 – Charles Fourier, French philosopher (d. 1837)
1780 – William Ellery Channing, American preacher and theologian (d. 1842)
1803 – James Curtiss, American journalist and politician, 11th Mayor of Chicago (d. 1859)
  1803   – Flora Tristan, French author and activist (d. 1844)
1811 – Hasan Tahsini, Albanian astronomer, mathematician, and philosopher (d. 1881)
1817 – Francesco Selmi, Italian chemist and patriot (d. 1881)
1848 – Randall Davidson, Scottish archbishop (d. 1930)
1859 – Walter Camp, American football player and coach (d. 1925)
1860 – Will Keith Kellogg, American businessman, founded the Kellogg Company (d. 1951)
1867 – Holger Pedersen, Danish linguist and academic (d. 1953)
1870 – Gustav Landauer, German theorist and activist (d. 1919)
1871 – Epifanio de los Santos, Filipino jurist, historian, and scholar (d. 1927)
1873 – John McGraw, American baseball player and manager (d. 1934)
1874 – Frederick Carl Frieseke, German-American painter (d. 1939)
1876 – Fay Moulton, American sprinter, football player, coach, and lawyer (d. 1945)
1882 – Bert Ironmonger, Australian cricketer (d. 1971)
  1882   – Kurt von Schleicher, German general and politician, 23rd Chancellor of Germany (d. 1934)
1883 – Gino Severini, Italian-French painter and author (d. 1966)
1884 – Clement Smoot, American golfer (d. 1963)
1886 – Ed Lafitte, American baseball player and soldier (d. 1971)
1889 – Gabriela Mistral, Chilean poet and educator, Nobel Prize laureate (d. 1957)
1890 – Paul Berth, Danish footballer (d. 1969)
  1890   – Victoria Ocampo. Argentine writer (d. 1979)
  1890   – Marjory Stoneman Douglas, American journalist and activist (d. 1998)
1891 – Ole Kirk Christiansen, Danish businessman, founded the Lego Group (d. 1958)
1892 – Julius Hirsch, German footballer (d. 1945)
  1893   – José Sobral de Almada Negreiros, Portuguese artist (d. 1970)
1893 – Allen Dulles, American lawyer and diplomat, 5th Director of Central Intelligence (d. 1969)
1895 – John Bernard Flannagan, American soldier and sculptor (d. 1942)
  1895   – Margarete Schön, German actress (d. 1985)
1896 – Frits Peutz, Dutch architect, designed the Glaspaleis (d. 1974)
1897 – Erich Löwenhardt, Polish-German lieutenant and pilot (d. 1918)
  1897   – Walter Winchell, American journalist and radio host (d. 1972)
1899 – Robert Casadesus, French pianist and composer (d. 1972)
1900 – Adolf Dymsza, Polish actor (d. 1975) 
  1900   – Tebbs Lloyd Johnson, English race walker (d. 1984)

1901–present
1902 – Eduard Eelma, Estonian footballer (d. 1941)
1903 – M. Balasundaram, Sri Lankan lawyer and politician (d. 1965)
  1903   – Edwin T. Layton, American admiral (d. 1984)
1904 – Roland Wilson, Australian economist and statistician (d. 1996)
1908 – Percy Faith, Canadian composer, conductor, and bandleader (d. 1976)
  1908   – Pete Zaremba, American hammer thrower (d. 1994)
1909 – Robert Charroux, French author and critic (d. 1978)
1910 – Melissanthi, Greek poet, teacher and journalist (d. 1990) 
1913 – Louise Currie, American actress (d. 2013)
  1913   – Charles Vanik, American soldier, judge, and politician (d. 2007)
1914 – Ralph Flanagan, American pianist, composer, and conductor (d. 1995)
  1914   – Domnitsa Lanitou-Kavounidou, Greek sprinter (d. 2011) 
1915 – Stanley Adams, American actor and screenwriter (d. 1977)
  1915   – Billie Holiday, American singer-songwriter and actress (d. 1959)
  1915   – Henry Kuttner, American author (d. 1958)
1916 – Anthony Caruso, American actor (d. 2003)
1917 – R. G. Armstrong, American actor and playwright (d. 2012)
1918 – Bobby Doerr, American baseball player and coach (d. 2017)
1919 – Roger Lemelin, Canadian author and screenwriter (d. 1992)
  1919   – Edoardo Mangiarotti, Italian fencer (d. 2012)
1920 – Ravi Shankar, Indian-American sitar player and composer (d. 2012)
1921 – Feza Gürsey, Turkish mathematician and physicist (d. 1992)
1922 – Mongo Santamaría, Cuban-American drummer (d. 2003)
1924 – Johannes Mario Simmel, Austrian-English author and screenwriter (d. 2009)
1925 – Chaturanan Mishra, Indian trade union leader and politician (d. 2011)
  1925   – Jan van Roessel, Dutch footballer (d. 2011)
1927 – Babatunde Olatunji, Nigerian-American drummer, educator, and activist (d. 2003)
  1927   – Leonid Shcherbakov, Russian triple jumper
1928 – James Garner, American actor, singer, and producer (d. 2014)
  1928   – Alan J. Pakula, American director, producer, and screenwriter (d. 1998)
  1928   – James White, Northern Irish author and educator (d. 1999)
1929 – Bob Denard, French soldier (d. 2007)
  1929   – Joe Gallo, American gangster (d. 1972)
1930 – Jane Priestman, English interior designer (d. 2021)
  1930   – Yves Rocher, French businessman, founded the Yves Rocher Company (d. 2009)
  1930   – Andrew Sachs, German-English actor and screenwriter (d. 2016)
  1930   – Roger Vergé, French chef and restaurateur (d. 2015)
1931 – Donald Barthelme, American short story writer and novelist  (d. 1989)
  1931   – Daniel Ellsberg, American activist and author
1932 – Cal Smith, American singer and guitarist (d. 2013)
1933 – Wayne Rogers, American actor, investor, and producer (d. 2015)
  1933   – Sakıp Sabancı, Turkish businessman and philanthropist (d. 2004)
1934 – Ian Richardson, Scottish-English actor (d. 2007)
1935 – Bobby Bare, American singer-songwriter and guitarist
  1935   – Hodding Carter III, American journalist and politician, Assistant Secretary of State for Public Affairs
1937 – Charlie Thomas, American singer 
1938 – Jerry Brown, American lawyer and politician, 34th and 39th Governor of California
  1938   – Spencer Dryden, American drummer (d. 2005)
  1938   – Freddie Hubbard, American trumpet player and composer (d. 2008)
  1938   – Iris Johansen, American author
1939 – Francis Ford Coppola, American director, producer, and screenwriter
  1939   – David Frost, English journalist and game show host (d. 2013)
  1939   – Gary Kellgren, American record producer, co-founded Record Plant (d. 1977)
  1939   – Brett Whiteley, Australian painter (d. 1992)
1940 – Marju Lauristin, Estonian academic and politician, 1st Estonian Minister of Social Affairs
1941 – James Di Pasquale, American composer
  1941   – Peter Fluck, English puppet maker and illustrator
  1941   – Cornelia Frances, English-Australian actress (d. 2018)
  1941   – Gorden Kaye, English actor (d. 2017)
1942 – Jeetendra, Indian actor, TV and film producer 
1943 – Mick Abrahams, English singer-songwriter and guitarist 
  1943   – Dennis Amiss, English cricketer and manager
1944 – Shel Bachrach, American insurance broker, investor, businessman and philanthropist
  1944   – Warner Fusselle, American sportscaster (d. 2012)
  1944   – Oshik Levi, Israeli singer and actor
  1944   – Julia Phillips, American film producer and author (d. 2002)
  1944   – Gerhard Schröder, German lawyer and politician, 7th Chancellor of Germany
  1944   – Bill Stoneman, American baseball player and manager
1945 – Megas, Icelandic singer-songwriter
  1945   – Gerry Cottle, English circus owner (d. 2021)
  1945   – Marilyn Friedman, American philosopher and academic
  1945   – Martyn Lewis, Welsh journalist and author
  1945   – Joël Robuchon, French chef and author (d. 2018)
  1945   – Werner Schroeter, German director and screenwriter (d. 2010)
  1945   – Hans van Hemert, Dutch songwriter and producer
1946 – Zaid Abdul-Aziz, American basketball player
  1946   – Colette Besson, French runner and educator (d. 2005)
  1946   – Herménégilde Chiasson, Canadian poet, playwright, and politician, 29th Lieutenant Governor of New Brunswick
  1946   – Dimitrij Rupel, Slovenian politician and diplomate
  1946   – Stan Winston, American special effects designer and makeup artist (d. 2008)
1947 – Patricia Bennett, American singer 
  1947   – Florian Schneider, German singer and drummer (d. 2020)
  1947   – Michèle Torr, French singer and author
1948 – John Oates, American singer-songwriter guitarist, and producer
  1948   – Arnie Robinson, American athlete (d. 2020)
1949 – Mitch Daniels, American academic and politician, 49th Governor of Indiana
1950 – Brian J. Doyle, American press secretary
  1950   – Neil Folberg, American-Israeli photographer
1951 – Bruce Gary, American drummer (d. 2006)
  1951   – Janis Ian, American singer-songwriter and guitarist
1952 – David Baulcombe, English geneticist and academic
  1952   – Jane Frederick, American hurdler and heptathlete
  1952   – Gilles Valiquette, Canadian actor, singer, and producer
  1952   – Dennis Hayden, American actor
1953 – Santa Barraza, American mixed media artist 
  1953   – Douglas Kell, English biochemist and academic
1954 – Jackie Chan, Hong Kong martial artist, actor, stuntman, director, producer, and screenwriter
  1954   – Tony Dorsett, American football player
1955 – Tim Cochran, American mathematician and academic (d. 2014)
  1955   – Gregg Jarrett, American lawyer and journalist
1956 – Annika Billström, Swedish businesswoman and politician, 16th Mayor of Stockholm
  1956   – Christopher Darden, American lawyer and author
  1956   – Georg Werthner, Austrian decathlete
1957 – Kim Kap-soo, South Korean actor
  1957   – Thelma Walker, British politician
1958 – Brian Haner, American singer-songwriter and guitarist
  1958   – Hindrek Kesler, Estonian architect
1960 – Buster Douglas, American boxer and actor
  1960   – Sandy Powell, English costume designer
1961 – Thurl Bailey, American basketball player and actor
  1961   – Pascal Olmeta, French footballer
  1961   – Brigitte van der Burg, Tanzanian-Dutch geographer and politician
1962 – Jon Cruddas, English lawyer and politician
  1962   – Andrew Hampsten, American cyclist
1963 – Jaime de Marichalar, Spanish businessman
  1963   – Nick Herbert, English businessman and politician, Minister for Policing
  1963   – Dave Johnson, American decathlete and educator
1964 – Jace Alexander, American actor and director
  1964   – Russell Crowe, New Zealand-Australian actor
  1964   – Steve Graves, Canadian ice hockey player
1965 – Bill Bellamy, American comedian, actor, and producer
  1965   – Rozalie Hirs, Dutch composer and poet
  1965   – Alison Lapper, English painter and photographer
  1965   – Nenad Vučinić, Serbian-New Zealand basketball player and coach
1966 – Richard Gomez, Filipino actor and politician
  1966   – Zvika Hadar, Israeli entertainer
  1966   – Béla Mavrák, Hungarian tenor singer
  1966   – Gary Wilkinson, English snooker player
1967 – Artemis Gounaki, Greek-German singer-songwriter
  1967   – Bodo Illgner, German footballer
  1967   – Simone Schilder, Dutch tennis player
1968 – Duncan Armstrong, Australian swimmer and sportscaster
  1968   – Jennifer Lynch, American actress, director, producer, and screenwriter
  1968   – Jože Možina, Slovenian historian, sociologist and journalist
  1968   – Vasiliy Sokov, Russian triple jumper
1969 – Ricky Watters, American football player
1970 – Leif Ove Andsnes, Norwegian pianist and educator
  1970   – Alexander Karpovtsev, Russian ice hockey player and coach (d. 2011)
1971 – Guillaume Depardieu, French actor (d. 2008)
  1971   – Victor Kraatz, German-Canadian figure skater
1972 – Tim Peake, British astronaut
1973 – Marco Delvecchio, Italian footballer
  1973   – Jeanine Hennis-Plasschaert, Dutch lawyer and politician, Dutch Minister of Defence
  1973   – Carole Montillet, French skier
  1973   – Christian O'Connell, British radio DJ and presenter
  1973   – Brett Tomko, American baseball player
1975 – Karin Dreijer Andersson, Swedish singer-songwriter and producer 
  1975   – Ronde Barber, American football player and sportscaster
  1975   – Tiki Barber, American football player and journalist
  1975   – Ronnie Belliard, American baseball player
  1975   – John Cooper, American singer-songwriter and bass player 
  1975   – Simon Woolford, Australian rugby league player
1976 – Kevin Alejandro, American actor and producer
  1976   – Martin Buß, German high jumper
  1976   – Jessica Lee, English lawyer and politician
  1976   – Aaron Lohr, American actor 
  1976   – Barbara Jane Reams, American actress
  1976   – Gang Qiang, Chinese anchor
1977 – Tama Canning, Australian-New Zealand cricketer
1978 – Jo Appleby, English soprano
  1978   – Duncan James, English singer-songwriter and actor 
  1978   – Lilia Osterloh, American tennis player
1979 – Adrián Beltré, Dominican-American baseball player
  1979   – Patrick Crayton, American football player
  1979   – Pascal Dupuis, Canadian ice hockey player
  1979   – Danny Sandoval, Venezuelan-American baseball player
1980 – Dragan Bogavac, Montenegrin footballer
  1980   – Bruno Covas,  Brazilian lawyer, politician (d. 2021)
  1980   – Tetsuji Tamayama, Japanese actor
1981 – Hitoe Arakaki, Japanese singer
1981 – Kazuki Watanabe, Japanese songwriter and guitarist (d. 2000)
  1981   – Vanessa Olivarez, American singer-songwriter, and actress
  1981   – Suzann Pettersen, Norwegian golfer
1982 – Silvana Arias, Peruvian actress
  1982   – Sonjay Dutt, American wrestler
  1982   – Kelli Young, English singer
1983 – Hamish Davidson, Australian musician
  1983   – Franck Ribéry, French footballer
  1983   – Jon Stead, English footballer
  1983   – Jakub Smrž, Czech motorcycle rider
  1983   – Janar Talts, Estonian basketball player
1984 – Hiroko Shimabukuro, Japanese singer 
1985 – KC Concepcion, Filipino actress and singer
  1985   – Humza Yousaf, Scottish politician
1986 – Brooke Brodack, American comedian
  1986   – Jack Duarte, Mexican actor, singer, and guitarist
  1986   – Andi Fraggs, English singer-songwriter and producer
  1986   – Christian Fuchs, Austrian footballer
1987 – Martín Cáceres, Uruguayan footballer
  1987   – Eelco Sintnicolaas, Dutch decathlete
  1987   – Jamar Smith, American football player
1988 – Antonio Piccolo, Italian footballer
  1988   – Ed Speleers, English actor and producer
1989 – Alexa Demara, American actress, model and writer
  1989   – Franco Di Santo, Argentinian footballer
  1989   – Mitchell Pearce, Australian rugby league player
  1989   – Teddy Riner, French judoka
1990 – Nickel Ashmeade, Jamaican sprinter
  1990   – Anna Bogomazova, Russian-American kick-boxer, martial artist, and wrestler
  1990   – Sorana Cîrstea, Romanian tennis player
  1990   – Trent Cotchin, Australian footballer
1991 – Luka Milivojević, Serbian footballer
  1991   – Anne-Marie, English singer-songwriter
1992 – Andreea Acatrinei, Romanian gymnast
  1992   – Guilherme Negueba, Brazilian footballer
1993 – Ichinojō Takashi, Mongolian sumo wrestler
1994 – Johanna Allik, Estonian figure skater
  1994   – Aaron Gray, Australian rugby league player  
1996 – Emerson Hyndman, American international soccer player
1997 – Rafaela Gómez, Ecuadorian tennis player

Deaths

Pre-1600
AD 30 – Jesus Christ (possible date of the crucifixion) (b. circa 4 BC)
 821 – George the Standard-Bearer, archbishop of Mytilene (b. c.  776)
 924 – Berengar I of Italy (b. 845)
1201 – Baha al-Din Qaraqush, regent of Egypt and builder of the Cairo Citadel
1206 – Frederick I, Duke of Lorraine
1340 – Bolesław Jerzy II of Mazovia (b. 1308)
1498 – Charles VIII of France (b. 1470)
1499 – Galeotto I Pico, Duke of Mirandola (b. 1442)
1501 – Minkhaung II, king of Ava (b. 1446)

1601–1900
1606 – Edward Oldcorne, English martyr (b. 1561)
1614 – El Greco, Greek-Spanish painter and sculptor (b. 1541)
1638 – Shimazu Tadatsune, Japanese daimyō (b. 1576)
1651 – Lennart Torstensson, Swedish field marshal and engineer (b. 1603)
1658 – Juan Eusebio Nieremberg, Spanish mystic and philosopher (b. 1595)
1661 – Sir William Brereton, 1st Baronet, English commander and politician (b. 1604)
1663 – Francis Cooke, English-American settler (b. 1583)
1668 – William Davenant, English poet and playwright (b. 1606)
1719 – Jean-Baptiste de La Salle, French priest and saint, founded the Institute of the Brothers of the Christian Schools (b. 1651)
1739 – Dick Turpin, English criminal (b. 1705)
1747 – Leopold I, Prince of Anhalt-Dessau (b. 1676)
1761 – Thomas Bayes, English minister and mathematician (b. 1701)
1766 – Tiberius Hemsterhuis, Dutch philologist and critic (b. 1685)
1767 – Franz Sparry, Austrian composer and director (b. 1715)
1779 – Martha Ray, English singer (b.1746)
1782 – Taksin, Thai king (b. 1734)
1789 – Abdul Hamid I, Ottoman sultan (b. 1725)
1789 – Petrus Camper, Dutch physician, anatomist, and physiologist (b. 1722)
1801 – Noël François de Wailly, French lexicographer and author (b. 1724)
1804 – Toussaint Louverture, Haitian general (b. 1743)
1811 – Garsevan Chavchavadze, Georgian diplomat and politician (b. 1757)
1823 – Jacques Charles, French physicist and mathematician (b. 1746)
1833 – Antoni Radziwiłł, Lithuanian composer and politician (b. 1775)
1836 – William Godwin, English journalist and author (b. 1756)
1849 – Pedro Ignacio de Castro Barros, Argentinian priest and politician (b. 1777)
1850 – William Lisle Bowles, English poet and critic (b. 1762)
1858 – Anton Diabelli, Austrian composer and publisher (b. 1781)
1868 – Thomas D'Arcy McGee, Irish-Canadian journalist, activist, and politician (b. 1825)
1879 – Begum Hazrat Mahal, Begum of Awadh, was the second wife of Nawab Wajid Ali Shah (b. 1820)
1884 – Maria Doolaeghe, Flemish novelist (b. 1803)
1885 – Karl Theodor Ernst von Siebold, German physiologist and zoologist (b. 1804)
1889 – Youssef Bey Karam, Lebanese soldier and politician (b. 1823)
  1889   – Sebastián Lerdo de Tejada, Mexican politician and president, 1872-1876 (b. 1823)
1891 – P. T. Barnum, American businessman and politician, co-founded The Barnum & Bailey Circus (b. 1810)

1901–present
1917 – Spyridon Samaras, Greek composer and playwright (b. 1861)
1918 – David Kolehmainen, Finnish wrestler (b. 1885)
  1918   – George E. Ohr, American potter (b. 1857)
1920 – Karl Binding, German lawyer and jurist (b. 1841)
1922 – James McGowen, Australian politician, 18th Premier of New South Wales (b. 1855)
1928 – Alexander Bogdanov, Russian physician, philosopher, and author (b. 1873)
1932 – Grigore Constantinescu, Romanian priest and journalist (b. 1875)
1938 – Suzanne Valadon, French painter (b. 1865)
1939 – Joseph Lyons, Australian educator and politician, 10th Prime Minister of Australia (b. 1879)
1943 – Jovan Dučić, Serbian-American poet and diplomat (b. 1871)
  1943   – Alexandre Millerand, French lawyer and politician, 12th President of France (b. 1859)
1947 – Henry Ford, American engineer and businessman, founded the Ford Motor Company (b. 1863)
1949 – John Gourlay, Canadian soccer player (b. 1872)
1950 – Walter Huston, Canadian-American actor and singer (b. 1883)
1955 – Theda Bara, American actress (b. 1885)
1956 – Fred Appleby, English runner (b. 1879)
1960 – Henri Guisan, Swiss general (b. 1874)
1965 – Roger Leger, Canadian ice hockey player (b. 1919)
1966 – Walt Hansgen, American race car driver (b. 1919)
1968 – Edwin Baker, Canadian co-founder of the Canadian National Institute for the Blind (CNIB) (b. 1893)
  1968   – Jim Clark, Scottish race car driver (b. 1936)
1972 – Joe Gallo, American gangster (b. 1929)
  1972   – Abeid Karume, Tanzanian politician, 1st President of Zanzibar (b. 1905)
1981 – Kit Lambert, English record producer and manager (b. 1935)
  1981   – Norman Taurog, American director and screenwriter (b. 1899)
1982 – Harald Ertl, Austrian race car driver and journalist (b. 1948)
1984 – Frank Church, American soldier, lawyer, and politician (b. 1924)
1985 – Carl Schmitt, German philosopher and jurist (b. 1888)
1986 – Leonid Kantorovich, Russian mathematician and economist (b. 1912)
1990 – Ronald Evans, American captain, engineer, and astronaut (b. 1933)
1991 – Memduh Ünlütürk, Turkish general (b. 1913)
1992 – Ace Bailey, Canadian ice hockey player and coach (b. 1903)
  1992   – Antonis Tritsis, Greek high jumper and politician, 71st Mayor of Athens (b. 1937)
1994 – Lee Brilleaux, English singer-songwriter and guitarist (b. 1952)
  1994   – Albert Guðmundsson, Icelandic footballer, manager, and politician (b. 1923)
  1994   – Golo Mann, German historian and author (b. 1909)
  1994   – Agathe Uwilingiyimana, Rwandan chemist, academic, and politician, Prime Minister of Rwanda (b. 1953)
1995 – Philip Jebb, English architect and politician (b. 1927)
1997 – Luis Aloma, Cuban-American baseball player (b. 1923)
  1997   – Georgy Shonin, Ukrainian-Russian general, pilot, and astronaut (b. 1935)
1998 – Alex Schomburg, Puerto Rican painter and illustrator (b. 1905)
1999 – Heinz Lehmann, German-Canadian psychiatrist and academic (b. 1911)
2001 – David Graf, American actor (b. 1950)
  2001   – Beatrice Straight, American actress (b. 1914)
2002 – John Agar, American actor (b. 1921)
2003 – Cecile de Brunhoff, French pianist and author (b. 1903)
  2003   – David Greene, English-American actor, director, producer, and screenwriter (b. 1921)
2004 – Victor Argo, American actor (b. 1934)
  2004   – Konstantinos Kallias, Greek politician (b. 1901)
2005 – Cliff Allison, English race car driver (b. 1932)
  2005   – Grigoris Bithikotsis, Greek singer-songwriter (b. 1922)
  2005   – Bob Kennedy, American baseball player, coach, and manager (b. 1920)
  2005   – Melih Kibar, Turkish composer and educator (b. 1951)
2007 – Johnny Hart, American author and illustrator (b. 1931)
  2007   – Barry Nelson, American actor (b. 1917)
2008 – Ludu Daw Amar, Burmese journalist and author (b. 1915)
2009 – Dave Arneson, American game designer, co-created Dungeons & Dragons (b. 1947)
2011 – Pierre Gauvreau, Canadian painter (b. 1922)
2012 – Steven Kanumba, Tanzanian actor and director (b. 1984)
  2012   – Satsue Mito, Japanese zoologist and academic (b. 1914)
  2012   – Ignatius Moses I Daoud, Syrian cardinal (b. 1930)
  2012   – David E. Pergrin, American colonel and engineer (b. 1917)
  2012   – Bashir Ahmed Qureshi, Pakistani politician (b. 1959)
  2012   – Mike Wallace, American television news journalist (b. 1918)
2013 – Marty Blake, American businessman (b. 1927)
  2013   – Les Blank, American director and producer (b. 1935)
  2013   – Andy Johns, English-American record producer (b. 1950)
  2013   – Lilly Pulitzer, American fashion designer (b. 1931)
  2013   – Irma Ravinale, Italian composer and educator (b. 1937)
  2013   – Mickey Rose, American screenwriter (b. 1935)
  2013   – Carl Williams, American boxer (b. 1959)
2014 – George Dureau, American painter and photographer (b. 1930)
  2014   – James Alexander Green, American-English mathematician and academic (b. 1926)
  2014   – V. K. Murthy, Indian cinematographer (b. 1923)
  2014   – Zeituni Onyango, Kenyan-American computer programmer (b. 1952)
  2014   – John Shirley-Quirk, English opera singer (b. 1931)
  2014   – George Shuffler, American guitarist (b. 1925)
  2014   – Josep Maria Subirachs, Spanish sculptor and painter (b. 1927)
  2014   – Royce Waltman, American basketball player and coach (b. 1942)
2015 – Tim Babcock, American soldier and politician, 16th Governor of Montana (b. 1919)
  2015   – José Capellán, Dominican-American baseball player (b. 1981)
  2015   – Stan Freberg, American puppeteer, voice actor, and singer (b. 1926)
  2015   – Richard Henyekane, South African footballer (b. 1983)
  2015   – Geoffrey Lewis, American actor (b. 1935)
2016 – Blackjack Mulligan, American professional wrestler (b. 1942)
2019 – Seymour Cassel, American actor (b. 1935)
2020 – John Prine, American country folk singer-songwriter (b. 1946)
  2020   – Herb Stempel, American television personality (b. 1926)
2021 – Tommy Raudonikis, Australian rugby league player and coach (b. 1950)

Holidays and observances 

 Christian feast days:
Aibert of Crespin
Blessed Alexander Rawlins
Blessed Edward Oldcorne and Blessed Ralph Ashley
Blessed Notker the Stammerer
Brynach
Hegesippus
Henry Walpole
Hermann Joseph
Jean-Baptiste de La Salle
Patriarch Tikhon of Moscow (Eastern Orthodox Church, Episcopal Church (USA))
April 7 (Eastern Orthodox liturgics)
Flag Day (Slovenia)
Genocide Memorial Day (Rwanda), and its related observance:
International Day of Reflection on the 1994 Rwanda Genocide (United Nations)
Motherhood and Beauty Day (Armenia)
National Beer Day (United States) 
Sheikh Abeid Amani Karume Day (Tanzania)
Women's Day (Mozambique)
Veterans' Day (Belgium)
World Health Day (International observance)

References

External links 

 BBC: On This Day
 
 Historical Events on April 7

Days of the year
April